Werner Hans Kramarsky (March 5, 1926 – August 22, 2019) was a Dutch-born American public official and art collector. His collection included works by Mel Bochner, Eva Hesse, Ellsworth Kelly, Sol LeWitt, Brice Marden, Agnes Martin, Richard Serra. He donated some of it to the Museum of Modern Art. He donated about 300 works on paper, to Harvard’s collection of contemporary art

His papers are in the archives of the MoMa where he was a trustee and a donor.

References

1926 births
2019 deaths
American art collectors
United States Navy personnel of World War II
Dutch emigrants to the United States
New York City public officials
New York University School of Law alumni
Art collectors from Amsterdam
People from Manhattan
The New School alumni